Ratman's Notebooks is a 1968 short novel by Stephen Gilbert. It features an unnamed social misfit who relates better to rats than to humans. It was the basis for the 1971 film Willard, its 1972 sequel Ben, and the 2003 remake of the original film. After the release of the original film, the book was re-released and re-titled Willard.

Plot
The book is set as a series of journal entries, where the unnamed narrator goes back and forth between his life with the rats and his work, in a low-level job at a company that his father used to own. In these entries, the young man dwells on the hatred he feels for his boss, the stresses of caring for his aging mother, a nameless girl he becomes fond of and above all the families of rats which he has befriended and which he uses for company and companionship.

Eventually, the young man trains the rats to do things for him. His favorite is an Agouti Berkshire rat (normal wild rat color, only with white markings on the belly, who in the film adaptations was portrayed as a white rat) which he calls "Socrates". A rival to Socrates is "Ben", a large rat that the narrator grows to despise when it refuses to listen to him. The young man uses the rats to wreak revenge upon his boss and havoc among the local shop owners and home owners, whom he has robbed with the aid of his rats. His "ratman" robberies become a newspaper sensation in the area and the man makes quite a stash of money for himself and for the girl he is courting at work. After his mother dies, the young man inherits the house.

When Socrates is killed at the young man's workplace by his boss Mr. Jones, he is forced to use Ben in his criminal escapades. He devises a plan to have the rats kill Mr. Jones, avenging Socrates' death. He then abandons all the rats at the scene of the crime, ridding himself of that part of his life. Eventually, as his relationship with the office girl moves towards marriage, Ben and his colony return, chasing the girl out of the house and trapping the young man in the attic.

The book ends with the young man madly scribbling in his journal about the rats gnawing away at the attic door.

Reprint
In 2013, Valancourt Books reprinted Ratman's Notebooks in paperback with an introduction by horror author Kim Newman.

References

External links
Ratman's Notebooks at Valancourt Books

1968 British novels
British horror novels
British novels adapted into films
English-language novels
Books about mice and rats
Fictional diaries
Michael Joseph books